The clapper lark has been split into two species:

Cape clapper lark, Mirafra apiata
Eastern clapper lark, Mirafra fasciolata